Enel X is the largest provider of demand response worldwide and products and services aimed at energy transformation at home, city and industrial level.  

By applying solutions resulting from the digital transformation to the energy sector, Enel X is dedicated to the fields of electric public transport, smart homes and smart cities, intelligent public lighting, integration of renewables, energy efficiency for businesses and public administrations.
Its offer includes service and products for the Business-to-Business, the Business-to-Consumer, and the Business-to-Government segments. Its main office is in Rome.

History
Enel X expanded its services by acquiring companies specialized in the digitization of energy services and by creating partnerships with companies from industries such as automotive, home automation and ITC.

Until the establishment of Enel X Way, it carried out activities in the field of electric mobility, leading to the installation of charging points throughout Italy. In July 2018, Enel X acquired 21% of Ufinet International, a platform in the ultra-broadband sector in Latin America. In the same period, Enel X expanded in the energy efficiency sector with the acquisition of Yousave. In October 2018, Enel X announced that its subsidiary EnerNOC, Inc. rebranded to Enel X. This operation was followed by the acquisition of Demand Energy (DEN) and eMotorWerks in the United States.

On December 20, 2018, Enel X and Infracapital signed a deal for energy efficiency projects for business customers. In September 2018, progresses on the installation of new charging points in Italy were announced. In January 2019, Enel X became Poland’s 2021 - 2023 demand response leader, with a 70% share in the segment.

In June 2019 Enel X and FCA signed a partnership agreement for the development of electric vehicle projects. In October 2019 the company signed a partnership with Hyundai, comprising the possibility of recharging electric vehicles at Enel X public recharging infrastructures. The same occurred with other car manufacturers, such as Audi, PSA   and Smart. 
In 2019, Enel X started the “Vivi Meglio” project, which was aimed at promoting energy efficiency, technical modernization, as well as to enhance safety standards in construction industry. In the same year, Homix was presented at the IBM Center in Milan. Homix integrates Alexa and allows a development of the concept of intelligent thermostat: it transforms, in fact, the device into a digital instrument that learns from domestic habits, in order to help manage consumption, safety and lighting at home. 
In January 2020, Enel X took part in the Consumer Electronics Show - CES in Las Vegas.
At the end of October 2020, Enel X Pay was founded with the aim of expanding the ecosystem of solutions for physical and digital payment services. In the same period, the acquisition of Paytipper S.p.A. and Cityposte Payment was completed. In 2022, Enel X’s electric mobility services have been incorporated into Enel X Way, the Enel Group’s new global business line entirely dedicated to sustainable mobility. Its aim is to accelerate the development of the charging infrastructure for electric vehicles. In the same year, the Enel Group’s electricity and gas commodity sales activities went under the management of Enel X. To this end, the Enel X Global Retail global business line was created to promote an integrated offer of “commodity” and “beyond commodity” solutions.

Activities
Enel X operates in the fields of energy supply and energy efficiency, with a portfolio of value-added products and services that promote a more autonomous and sustainable use of energy. Enel X manages demand response services with 6.7 GW of total capacity, and over 2.8 million lighting points worldwide. It provides energy services to around 69 million end customers worldwide through companies dedicated to the sale of electricity and gas. It works globally for the development of innovative solutions regarding the energy transition. Furthermore, by promoting the electrification of consumption and the digitalization of processes, it supports companies in improving their energy performance and achieving Net Zero objectives. Enel X supports public administrations in achieving decarbonization and sustainability objectives by providing services for electrified, digitized and circular cities.

With a positive attitude for innovation, Enel X created an “Innovation & Product Lab”, to develop and test new scalable products and services – often incorporating the creative input of startups, research centers, universities and customers – with a circular economy approach. Solutions and services for flexibility, like Demand Response, digital payment, adaptive public lighting systems and City Analytics are a direct result. At the end of 2021, from the development of these innovative projects, Enel X and Policlinico Universitario Agostino Gemelli IRCCS developed Smart Axistance e-Well, a telemedicine service with an app designed for companies.

Awards
In 2017, Enel X won Corporate Art Award 2017 “for its ability to promote historical heritage and urban projects through artistic lighting”. In 2018, it took the third place on the podium on the charging services Leaderboard drawn up by Navigant Research. In 2019, Enel X’s circular economy model took centre stage at EXCO 2019, an event which focused on international cooperation. In 2021 and 2022, Enel X has been named a market leader in the Energy as a Service Leaderboard report from Guidehouse Insights.

References

Enel
1999 initial public offerings
Companies based in Rome
Companies formerly listed on the New York Stock Exchange
Conglomerate companies of Italy
Electrical engineering companies of Italy
Energy companies established in 1962
Energy companies of Italy
Government-owned companies of Italy
Italian brands
Multinational companies headquartered in Italy
Natural gas companies of Italy
Non-renewable resource companies established in 1962
Oil and gas companies of Italy
Partly privatized companies of Italy
Electric power companies of Italy
Renewable energy companies of Europe
Renewable energy companies of Italy
Renewable resource companies established in 1981
Renewable resource companies established in 2003
Italian companies established in 1962